Paul Rhys (born 19 December 1963) is a Welsh theatre, television and film actor.

Early life
Rhys was born in Neath to working class Catholic parents, Kathryn Ivory and her husband Richard Charles Rhys, a labourer. At fourteen, he bred and trained horses, becoming a highly accomplished rider. A committed punk during his youth, Rhys sang in several bands. His first acting job was playing Liverpudlian judo expert Ralph in John Godber's hit play Bouncers, before leaving for London, where he qualified for his Equity card by singing jazz standards at lunchtime for Peter Boizot's Pizza Express and Kettners.

Career
Rhys received a Bernard Shaw Scholarship to study at RADA. In the first term he was spotted by Philip Prowse and was invited to perform in Oscar Wilde's A Woman of No Importance at the Glasgow Citizens Theatre, playing the illegitimate son, Gerald. He also appeared as Dean Swift in Julian Temple's film Absolute Beginners. Rhys completed his education at RADA by winning the William Pole prize and the Bancroft Gold Medal on graduation.

Film
His next film role was in Franklin J. Schaffner's Lionheart. After a brief spell at the Royal Shakespeare Company he played opposite Colin Firth in Richard Eyre's award-winning film Tumbledown. Soon after this, he appeared in Vincent & Theo, directed by the legendary American film director Robert Altman, as Vincent van Gogh's younger brother Theo van Gogh. Continuing the theme of famous brothers, Paul then played Sydney Chaplin opposite Robert Downey, Jr.'s Charlie Chaplin in Richard Attenborough's Chaplin. He went on to play Massis in Alan Bennett's 102 Boulevard Haussmann. He then appeared opposite Peter O'Toole in Rebecca's Daughters. A series of films then followed including From Hell, Food of Love, Love Lies Bleeding, Becoming Colette and Hellraiser: Deader.

Television
Running parallel to Rhys's film work has been a diverse and notable television career, working in leading roles with directors such as Mike Hodges, Stephen Frears, Sir Richard Eyre, Philip Martin, Christopher Morahan, Tom Vaughan, Edward Hall, Harry Bradbeer in productions including Tumbledown, A Dance to the Music of Time, The Heroes, Ghosts, Gallowglass, The Healer, Anna Karenina, The Deal, Beethoven, The Ten Commandments, and more recently the television series Borgia, Luther, and Spooks.

In 2008 Rhys appeared in the series "Agatha Christie's Poirot" "Mrs MacGinty's dead". In 2014, he played the lead as traitor Aldrich Ames, in The Assets miniseries, then as King George III in Turn: Washington's Spies and as Sir John Conroy in Victoria. He has made a minor industry out of playing vampires: Being Human (as Ivan); as Vlad, the Prince of Wallachia aka Dracula in seasons 1-3 of the 2015 series "Da Vinci's Demons"; and as Andrew Hubbard in two seasons of the 2020-21 hit, A Discovery of Witches.

Theatre

Rhys’ early stage work included performances at Glasgow Citizen’s Theatre, Royal Shakespeare Company, Riverside Studios, Compass Theatre, and Young Vic.  His first appearance at the Royal National Theatre was opposite Ian McKellen in Bent, subsequently playing Angelo in Measure for Measure for which he won the Critics' Circle Theatre Award; Houseman in The Invention of Love; and Edgar in King Lear, for which he was nominated for an Olivier Award. He appeared as Edmund in Long Day's Journey into Night and as Leo in Design for Living at The Donmar Warehouse, performing opposite Rachel Weisz and Clive Owen. In 2000 he played the title role in Hamlet at the Young Vic and later in Tokyo and Osaka.  He received several awards for this performance. Rhys continued a collaboration with Theatre de la Complicite's Simon McBurney, starring both as Wolan and The Master in Complicité's Master and Margarita. The show opened at the Barbican in 2010 and continued on international tour, returning to the Barbican for a second sell-out season in 2012. In 2016, he starred in a new version of Chekhov's Uncle Vanya by Robert Icke at The Almeida Theatre alongside Tobias Menzies, Jessica Brown-Findley and Vanessa Kirby.

Real-life characters played by Rhys have included Vlad Tepes, Ludwig van Beethoven, Peter Mandelson, Paul McCartney, Thomas De Quincey, A. E. Housman, Frédéric Chopin, and Marcus Tullius Cicero.

On two occasions, Rhys was taken to hospital while working on a stage production, once with pneumonia and the other with exhaustion. In the title role in Howard Brenton's play Paul at the National Theatre, he was unable to continue as he had lost an unhealthy amount of weight, dropping from 76 to 57 kilos.

Personal life
Rhys was in a relationship with the late Australian actress Arkie Whiteley, with whom he appeared in Gallowglass.  He is an cyclist and practices Transcendental Meditation and Ashtanga yoga. He is a animal lover and supports PETA. His interests include LGBTQ+ issues, contemporary literature, art and architectural design.

Filmography

Film

Television

Theatre

References

External links
 

1963 births
Alumni of RADA
Critics' Circle Theatre Award winners
Living people
People from Neath
Welsh male stage actors
Welsh male film actors
Welsh male television actors